Mykola Koltsov (11 May 1936 – 27 December 2011) was a Soviet footballer and Ukrainian football children and youth trainer.

Koltsov also was decorated by the President of Ukraine only one month before his death. He died in Kharkiv, aged 75.

Honours

As player
Soviet Top League (with Dynamo Kyiv)
 Champion (1): 1961

References

1936 births
2011 deaths
Russian footballers
Ukrainian footballers
Soviet footballers
FC Zirka Kropyvnytskyi players
FC Metalist Kharkiv players
FC Dynamo Kyiv players
PFC Krylia Sovetov Samara players
Soviet Top League players
Association football defenders
People from Voronezh